Robert Morris University (RMU) is a private university in Moon Township, Pennsylvania. It was founded in 1921 and is named after Robert Morris, known as the "financier of the [American] revolution." It enrolls nearly 5,000 students and offers 60 bachelor's degree programs and 35 master's and doctoral programs. Most students are from the Pittsburgh area, while 16 percent of freshmen in 2018 were from outside Pennsylvania.

History
Robert Morris University originated in 1921 as the Pittsburgh School of Accountancy, founded by Andrew Blass using a curriculum similar to what he had overseen as dean of the Pace Institute in Washington, D.C. His successor, C.W. Salmond, oversaw an expansion in 1935 that added business and secretarial studies, and the school was renamed the Robert Morris School of Business in honor of the Founding Father popularly known as the "financier of the American Revolution." In 1942, the Robert Morris School moved to the William Penn Hotel to accommodate its growing enrollment, and in 1959 purchased its own Downtown building at 600 Fifth Ave.

In 1962 the school purchased Pine Hill Manor and Farm in Moon Township, Pennsylvania, formerly the home of Oliver Kaufmann, vice president of Kaufmann's department store in Pittsburgh, his wife, Freda, and their children. The Commonwealth of Pennsylvania then granted the school permission to award associate degrees, and the school became Robert Morris Junior College, operating from two separate campuses. The first new buildings on the Moon Township campus, Franklin Center and three residence halls, were erected in 1963.

The school became Robert Morris College in 1969 when it began offering bachelor's degrees in business administration. The first graduate students were admitted in 1978 for master's degree programs in business administration, taxation, and business teacher education; the first doctoral program was offered in 1999. In 2002, the school attained university status and was thus renamed Robert Morris University.  In 2010, the university sold its Downtown Center at 600 Fifth Avenue to Duquesne University.

In 2016, Christopher B. Howard became the university's eighth president. Howard was the president of Hampden-Sydney College and the first African-American president in RMU's history. He was succeeded by Michelle Patrick in 2022, the first woman to serve as RMU president.

Campus
The core campus consists of a  tract in Moon Township, Pennsylvania, a suburb of Pittsburgh near Pittsburgh International Airport. The main campus building is Nicholson Center, which houses dining and meeting facilities, classrooms and faculty offices, and a bookstore. It is attached to the Patrick Henry Center, which houses the library, a TV studio, and numerous offices and classrooms. RMU participates in inter-library lending consortia PALINET and PALCI that allow RMU students to borrow books on site from most of the college and university libraries in the Pittsburgh area.

The School of Business building contains the PNC Trading Center, the United States Steel Corporation Video Conferencing and Technology Center, the ATI Center, classrooms, and the President's Office. Scaife Center is the newest academic building on campus, having opened in 2015; it is the home of the Regional Research and Innovation in Simulation Education (RISE) Center. Wheatley Center houses the School of Informatics, Humanities and Social Sciences. John Jay Center is the home of the School of Engineering, Mathematics and Science. Hale Center is the main university classroom building. The nondenominational Rogal Chapel is perched on a small hilltop overlooking campus.

Of 14 residence halls, three are newer apartment-style complexes; the university also has converted a former hotel nearby into Yorktown Hall, now entirely student housing. Nearly 2,000 students live in campus housing, including 85 percent of freshmen.

The UPMC Events Center and Peoples Court is the home of basketball and volleyball teams. The center also has extensive conference, classroom, and meeting facilities and is a venue for concerts, speakers, and other events. Football and lacrosse teams play on campus at Joe Walton Stadium, named for the Colonials' founding head football coach. Soccer teams play on the North Athletic Complex field. A fully equipped Student Recreation and Fitness Center opened in 2018 on campus.

Clearview Arena is the home of the men's and women's ice hockey teams at the RMU Island Sports Center, a  sports and recreation facility at nearby Neville Island in the Ohio River  from Downtown Pittsburgh. The center is open to the public year-round and contains two indoor and two outdoor ice rinks, an indoor hockey arena (home to the Steel City Icebergs), and a dome that accommodates an indoor golf driving range. The center also has an outdoor 18-hole miniature golf course.

The university also has classes online and at its Downtown campus at 339 Sixth Avenue in Pittsburgh, also the home of the Bayer Center for Nonprofit Management at Robert Morris University. The university offers training in additive manufacturing at a 3D printing lab and classroom in the Energy Innovation Center in the Lower Hill District.

Academics
RMU offers 60 undergraduate and 35 graduate degree programs. It also offers 39 professionally focused certificate programs.

The School of Engineering, Mathematics, and Science is one of only 17 universities in the country named a Center of Actuarial Excellence by the Society of Actuaries.

The School of Business offers a sport management course on the WWE. The course examines "the cutting-edge business and artistic presentation practices of a global leader in live entertainment" and "reviews the history covering the professional wrestling business, its talent development, theatrical influences/production practices, event/facility management operations as well as WWE's innovative branding, marketing and mass media strategies." RMU was the first university in Pennsylvania to join the Amazon Web Service Academy and offer cloud computing certification curriculum. On October 7, 2022, the university announced that the school would be renamed the Rockwell School of Business. This was a result of an $18 million gift from the S. Kent Rockwell Foundation and the Kent Rockwell family, the largest personal gift in the university’s history and a tremendous investment in entrepreneurial and business education.

To support students from underrepresented groups who want to pursue careers in technology or math, Netflix co-founder and CEO Reed Hastings made a $3 million gift in January 2021 to fund 20 full scholarships for RMU Next Century Scholars. The 20 scholarships were open to qualified applicants pursuing degrees in computer and information systems; cybersecurity; data analytics; actuarial science; mathematics; statistics and predictive analysis; computer science; and user experience user interface design (UX-UI).

In October 2022, Robert Morris University was one of two recipients of a record-setting $8.82 million gift from the Pierce Foundation for dyslexia education, the largest gift of its kind ever made in the state of Pennsylvania. The Peirce family previously committed $2 million to Robert Morris University in 2017 to establish the Bob and Joan Peirce Center for Structured Reading Teacher Training, which trains teachers to work with children with dyslexia and other learning disabilities.

On September 22, 2022, the university announced that Russ Olsen '82 made a multi-million dollar gift to rename the library as the Elaine Boyd Library and support improvements to the library along with ongoing student support and services.

Each semester, Robert Morris University hosts one Rooney International Visiting Scholar in residence on campus, who can teach a course, deliver presentations and guest lectures, and collaborate with RMU faculty on joint research projects. Past Rooney Scholars include Ambassador Robin R. Sanders, Andrea Jeftanovic, and Misha Segal.

Robert Morris University is accredited by the Middle States Commission on Higher Education. The School of Business is accredited by AACSB International. On June 29, 2022, Robert Morris University announced that it earned the AACSB Accounting accreditation, the first university in Western Pennsylvania to do so. B.S. programs in information sciences and computer information systems are accredited by the Computing Accreditation Commission of ABET, while B.S. programs in engineering and manufacturing engineering are accredited by ABET's Engineering Accreditation Commission. Initial teacher preparation and advanced educator programs are accredited by the Council for the Accreditation of Educator Preparation (CAEP). Nursing programs are accredited by the Commission on Collegiate Nursing Education, and nuclear medicine by the Joint Review Committee on Education Programs in Nuclear Medicine Technology; the Regional Research and Innovation in Simulation Education (RISE) Center at Robert Morris University is accredited by the Council for Accreditation of Healthcare Simulation Programs.

Student life 
RMU offers more than 160 student organizations, clubs, and activities on campus. The Colonial Theatre program stages several productions annually, including some that have won honors at the Kennedy Center American College Theater Festival. The RMU Bands and Performing Ensembles features a marching show band, pep band, jazz band, wind ensemble, and fife & drum corps. The band's auxiliary includes a color guard, dance team, and majorette squad.

Students field 17 club sports teams including ice hockey, bowling, rugby and golf. Greek life is both social and service-oriented, with 14 percent of women joining sororities and 10 percent of men in fraternities. Presently, there are chapters of Zeta Tau Alpha, Delta Phi Epsilon, Sigma Kappa, Delta Zeta, Phi Delta Theta, Delta Tau Delta, Phi Mu Delta, Sigma Tau Gamma, Alpha Chi Rho, Phi Sigma Kappa, and Kappa Delta Rho active on campus.

Army ROTC is an elective program that serves in conjunction with students' existing degree programs began at Robert Morris University in the spring of 2006, and it is part of the Three Rivers Battalion hosted at the University of Pittsburgh. Currently, the Pittsburgh ROTC program has more than 250 students from 13 different universities in western Pennsylvania. The current universities are the University of Pittsburgh, University of Pittsburgh Greensburg, Robert Morris University, Franciscan University of Steubenville, La Roche University, Carnegie Mellon University, Duquesne University, Washington & Jefferson College, PennWest California (formerly California University of Pennsylvania), Chatham University, St. Vincent College, Carlow University, and Point Park University. The program is open to students of any of the 13 colleges or universities in the greater Pittsburgh area.

The student-run RMU Sentry Media website includes news and feature stories as well as programming from RMU-TV and RMU-Radio. The Sentry's sports affiliate, Colonial Sports Network, provides breaking athletics news as well as athlete and coach features, game recaps and more.

Athletics 

Robert Morris' sports teams, nicknamed "the Colonials", wear the school colors of blue, white, and red. The Colonials compete in NCAA Division I (FCS, formerly Division I-AA, in football). Most of the school's teams play in the Horizon League, though the football team plays in the Big South Conference, the men's ice hockey team competed in Atlantic Hockey, the women's ice hockey team was a member of the College Hockey America, and women's rowing competes in the Metro Atlantic Athletic Conference. Men's teams are basketball, football, golf, ice hockey, lacrosse, cross country, and soccer. Women's teams are basketball, cross country, ice hockey, lacrosse, rowing, soccer, softball, track and field, and volleyball.

The Colonials officially joined the NCAA in 1976 and appeared in its first NCAA tournament in 1982, in men's basketball. Robert Morris men's and women's teams have won 45 league championships in NCAA Division I.

On March 19, 2013, the Colonials men's basketball team defeated the Kentucky Wildcats, the defending national champions, in Moon Township by a score of 59–57 in the first round of the National Invitation Tournament (NIT).

On May 26, 2021, the university disbanded both the men's and women's varsity hockey programs. On December 17, 2021 it was announced that the RMU D1 men's and women's hockey teams will be reinstated, returning to play in the 2023-24 season.

Notable alumni
Olubowale Victor Akintimehin, rapper, stage name Wale
Charlie Batch, motivational speaker and former Pittsburgh Steelers quarterback
 Kevin Colbert, general manager of the Pittsburgh Steelers
 William J. Coyne, Former member of the United States House of Representatives from Pennsylvania
 Hank Fraley, NFL assistant coach and former NFL offensive lineman
 Phyllis Hyman, R&B, disco, and soul singer
 Brianne McLaughlin, 2010 Winter Olympics and 2014 Winter Olympics women's ice hockey goalie
 Robin R. Sanders, United States Ambassador to Nigeria (2007–2010)
 Kirsten Welsh, first female OHL linesperson
 Jeff Garner, President of Pittsburgh Riverhounds SC

References

External links
 
 Robert Morris Athletics website

 
Educational institutions established in 1921
Universities and colleges in Pittsburgh
1921 establishments in Pennsylvania
Private universities and colleges in Pennsylvania